Howard Sloan Young Sr. (August 7, 1879 – October 14, 1961) was a justice of the Indiana Supreme Court from January 1, 1945, to January 1, 1951.

Born in Indianapolis, Young attended the University of Chicago, graduating in 1898 and going on to receive his law degree from the Indiana Law School in 1903. He opened a solo practice in 1904, and in 1916 joined the law firm of Elam, Fesler, Elam & Young. He served as a United States Commissioner from 1920 to 1944, also serving as president of the Indianapolis Bar Association from 1931 to 1932. He also served on the Indianapolis School Board.

In 1944, Young was elected to the Indiana Supreme Court as a Republican, taking office on January 1, 1945, and serving until January 1, 1951, when he resigned to practice law in association with his son, Howard S. Young Jr. He died in Indianapolis, after a two-month illness.

References

Justices of the Indiana Supreme Court
1879 births
1961 deaths
University of Chicago alumni
Indiana University Robert H. McKinney School of Law alumni